Stow is a surname. Notable people with the name include:

Alexander W. Stow (1805–54), American jurist
Augustine Stow (1833–1903), South Australian politician
Baron Stow, (1801–69), American Baptist minister, writer and editor
David Stow (1793–1864), Scottish educationalist
Gardner Stow (born c. 1790), American lawyer
George William Stow (1822–82), English-born South African geologist and ethnologist
Hamilton Hobart Stow (1837–1905), American oil well operator
Horatio J. Stow (c. 1809 – 1859), New York lawyer and politician
James Stow (c. 1770–in or after 1823), English engraver
Jefferson Stow (1830–1908), English-born newspaper editor and magistrate in South Australia
Jennifer Stow, scientist
John Stow (c. 1525 – 1605), English historian and antiquarian
Sir John Montague Stow (1911–97), politician from Barbados
John Stow (priest), Archdeacon of Bermuda from 1951 to 1961
Joshua Stow (1762–1842), founder of Stow, Ohio
Marietta Stow (1830 or 1837–1902), American suffragist
Montague Stow (1847–1911), English cricketer and lawyer
Percy Stow (1876–1919), British director of short films
Randolph Stow (1935–2010), Australian writer
Randolph Isham Stow (1828–78), English-born Australian judge
Selina Catherine Stow (1870-1956), British botanist
Silas Stow (1773–1827), American politician
Thomas Stow (1801–62), English-born Australian pioneer Congregational clergym 
Patrick Stow (1770–1825),South African lawyer